Genomic Health was a company focusing on genetic research specifically in cancer detection, based out of Redwood City, California. The company was acquired by and merged with Exact Sciences Corporation in 2019.

History
Genomic Health, Inc. was founded in 2000 by Randy Scott, who had previously founded and been CEO at Incyte. He formed the company after a close friend was diagnosed with cancer and had the idea for treatment based on the specific genome of their tumor.

By 2003 Genomic Health had developed Oncotype DX, a genomic assay that quantified the likelihood of breast cancer recurrence.

Investors at the time already included Versant Ventures and Kleiner Perkins Caufield & Byers.

Genomic Health also started a subsidiary in 2010, Invitae, with the goal of aggregating multiple genetics tests. Invitae was spun off in 2012.

The company expanded with international headquarters in Geneva Switzerland and UK headquarters in London in 2011.

In July 2019, Exact Sciences announced that it was purchasing Genomic Health to increase the variety of medical tests they offer.

See also
Human genome
Genetic testing

References

External links

Medical genetics
Genomics companies
Health care companies established in 2000
American companies established in 2000
2000 establishments in California
Health care companies based in California
Companies based in Redwood City, California
Companies formerly listed on the Nasdaq
2005 initial public offerings
2019 mergers and acquisitions